Bang Kaeo is a district (amphoe) of Phatthalung province, southern Thailand.

Geography
Neighboring districts are (from the south clockwise) Pak Phayun, Pa Bon, Tamot, and Khao Chaison of Phatthalung Province, and Krasae Sin of Songkhla province.

The eastern part of the district is at the shore of Thale Luang, the northern part of Songkhla Lake.

History
The minor district (king amphoe) was established on 1 April 1990, when three tambon were split off from Khao Chaison district. It was upgraded to a full district on 7 September 1995.

Administration
The district is divided into three sub-districts (tambons), which are further subdivided into 33 villages (mubans). Tha Maduea is a township (thesaban tambon) which covers parts of tambons Tha Maduea and Khok Sak. Another part of Khok Sak belongs to the township Mae Khari, centered in neighboring Tamot District. There are a further three tambon administrative organizations (TAO).

References

External links
amphoe.com

Districts of Phatthalung province